Hamngatan (Swedish: Port Street) is a street in central Stockholm. It goes from Sergels torg down to Nybroplan, past NK department store, Kungsträdgården, Norrmalmstorg, and Berzelii Park. The Djurgården line travels along this street between Nybroplan and Norrmalmstorg.

Streets in Stockholm